Cercospora gerberae is a fungal plant pathogen.

References

gerberae
Fungal plant pathogens and diseases